Gian Francesco d'Agrate (1489- after 1563) was an Italian sculptor and architect, active principally in Parma. It this city, he labored in the construction and decoration of the Sanctuary of Santa Maria della Steccata with the help of his brother Marco, and under the guidance of  Bernardino Zaccagni.

References

16th-century Italian sculptors
Italian male sculptors
Artists from Parma
1489 births
Year of death unknown
Architects from Parma
16th-century Italian architects